Gunilla is a Swedish female name, derived from Gunhild. It was among the top feminine names in the Scandinavian countries in the 1940s.

People named Gunilla
Gunilla Andersson (born 1975), ice hockey player from Sweden
Gunilla Bergström (1942–2021), Swedish author, journalist, and illustrator
Gunilla Bielke (1568–1597), the second spouse and queen consort of John III of Sweden
Gunilla Carlsson (born 1963), Swedish politician
Gunilla Carlsson (Social Democrat) (born 1966), Swedish Social Democratic politician
Gunilla Florby (1943–2011), Swedish academic
Gunilla Forseth (born 1985), Norwegian football striker
Gunilla Gerland (born 1963). Swedish author
Gunilla Hutton (born 1944), Swedish actress
Gunilla Knutson, Swedish model and actress
Gunilla Lindberg (born 1947), Swedish sports official
Gunilla Süssmann (born 1977), Norwegian classical pianist
Gunilla Sköld-Feiler (born 1953), Swedish artist
Gunilla Svärd (born 1970), Swedish orienteering competitor
Gunilla Tjernberg (1950–2019), Swedish Christian Democratic politician
Gunilla Wahlén (born 1951), Swedish Left Party politician

References

Swedish feminine given names
Norwegian feminine given names